Gray is a census-designated place (CDP) in Terrebonne Parish, Louisiana. The population was 5,518 in 2020. It is part of the Houma–Bayou Cane–Thibodaux metropolitan statistical area.

Geography
Gray is located at  (29.680993, -90.781414).

Demographics

As of the 2020 United States census, there were 5,518 people, 2,094 households, and 1,370 families residing in the CDP.

Education
 H. L. Bourgeois High School

 Covenant Christian Academy

Notable people 

 Beryl Amedee, member of the Louisiana House of Representatives
 JaJuan Dawson, NFL wide receiver
 Jesse Myles, NFL running back

References

External links
Gray's daily newspaper -- Houmatoday.com

Census-designated places in Louisiana
Census-designated places in Terrebonne Parish, Louisiana
Census-designated places in Houma – Thibodaux metropolitan area